Udini Square is a shopping mall at Gelugor, a southern suburb of George Town in Penang, Malaysia. Opened in 2015, the three-storey mall is currently anchored by two sporting good chains, SportsDirect.com and MST Golf Superstore, as well as Mr D.I.Y., Malaysia's largest hardware chain.

Udini Square was developed by a Malaysian property developer, IJM Corporation, with a gross development value of RM75 million. The suburban lifestyle mall caters to residents within Gelugor, and sits near the Tun Dr Lim Chong Eu Expressway that links George Town, the Penang Bridge and Penang International Airport.

Retail outlets 
The lower two floors of the mall consist of retail space, while the uppermost level comprises office space.

The three major anchor tenants are SportsDirect.com, MST Golf Superstore and Mr D.I.Y. Other retail outlets and eateries within the mall include Hanabi, Frank Laurent, Nagomi, myNEWS.com, My Nail Parlour, Baptain Hair Salon, Grab Service Center and Piccolo Cafe.

Location 
Udini Square is located at Lebuh Tunku Kudin 3 at Gelugor, George Town's southernmost suburb. It is connected to the adjacent Lotus departmental store via an overhead footbridge. The two shopping centres are also sited close to the Tun Dr Lim Chong Eu Expressway, which runs along the eastern coastline of Penang Island between George Town and Batu Maung to the southeast.

Transport 
Rapid Penang buses 13 and 206 serve the area.

See also 
 List of shopping malls in Malaysia

References 

Shopping malls in Penang
Shopping malls established in 2015
Buildings and structures in George Town, Penang
2015 establishments in Malaysia